Michael Fassbender (born 2 April 1977) is an Irish actor. He is the recipient of various accolades, including a Screen Actors Guild Award, a Critics' Choice Movie Award, and nominations for two Academy Awards, four British Academy Film Awards and three Golden Globe Awards.

Born in Heidelberg and raised in Killarney, Fassbender made his feature film debut as a Spartan warrior in the fantasy war epic 300 (2006). His earlier roles included various stage productions, as well as starring roles on television such as in the HBO miniseries Band of Brothers (2001) and the Sky One fantasy drama Hex (2004–05). He first came to prominence for his role as IRA volunteer Bobby Sands in Hunger (2008), for which he won a British Independent Film Award. Subsequent roles include the independent film Fish Tank (2009), as a Royal Marines lieutenant in Inglourious Basterds (2009), as Edward Rochester in the 2011 film adaptation of Jane Eyre, as Carl Jung in A Dangerous Method (2011), as the sentient android, David 8, in Ridley Scott's Prometheus (2012) and its sequel, Alien: Covenant (2017), and in the musical comedy drama Frank (2014) as an eccentric musician loosely inspired by Frank Sidebottom.

Fassbender debuted as the Marvel Comics supervillain Magneto in X-Men: First Class (2011), and went on to share the role with Ian McKellen in X-Men: Days of Future Past (2014) before reprising it again in X-Men: Apocalypse (2016) and Dark Phoenix (2019). Also in 2011, his performance as a sex addict in Shame earned him the Volpi Cup for Best Actor at the Venice Film Festival and was nominated for Golden Globe and BAFTA Awards. His role as slave owner Edwin Epps in 12 Years a Slave (2013) was similarly praised, earning him his first Academy Award nomination for Best Supporting Actor. In the same year, Fassbender appeared in another Ridley Scott film, The Counselor. He portrayed the title role in the Danny Boyle-directed biopic Steve Jobs (2015), and played Macbeth in Justin Kurzel's adaptation of William Shakespeare's play. For the former, he received Academy Award, BAFTA, Golden Globe and SAG nominations. He also produced and starred in the Western Slow West (2015). In 2020, he was listed at number nine on The Irish Times list of Ireland's greatest film actors.

Fassbender began competing in auto racing in 2017 with the Ferrari Challenge. He currently races in the European Le Mans Series, driving for Proton Competition.

Early life
Fassbender was born in Heidelberg on 2 April 1977, the son of an Irish mother Adele (from Larne) and German father Josef Fassbender. He has an older sister named Catherine, who is a neuropsychologist at the MIND Institute in Sacramento, California. According to lore on his mother's side of family, his mother is the great-grandniece of Michael Collins, an Irish leader during the War of Independence. When Fassbender was two years old, his parents moved with him to Killarney in Ireland to operate the West End House, a restaurant where his father also worked as a chef. His parents chose Killarney because they wanted their children to grow up in the countryside, in contrast to the industrial backdrop of their previous German residence.

Fassbender was raised Catholic and served as an altar boy at the church his family attended. He and his sister spent summer holidays in Germany. He attended Fossa National School near Killarney and St. Brendan's College in Killarney itself. He decided that he wanted to be an actor at age 17 when he was cast in a play. At 19, he left home to study at the Drama Centre London. In 1999, he dropped out of the Drama Centre and toured with the Oxford Stage Company to perform the play Three Sisters. Before finding steady work as an actor, he worked as a bartender, postman, manual labourer, market researcher for Royal Mail, and Dell employee.

Acting career

Early work

Fassbender's first screen role was that of Pat Christenson in Tom Hanks and Steven Spielberg's award-winning television miniseries Band of Brothers (2001). He played the character of Azazeal in both series of Hex on Sky One and starred as the main character in the music video for the song "Blind Pilots" by the British band The Cooper Temple Clause. In the video, he plays the part of a man out with friends on a stag night who slowly transforms into a goat due to wearing a cowbell necklace.

Fassbender played Jonathan Harker in a ten-part radio serialisation of Dracula produced by BBC Northern Ireland and broadcast in the Book at Bedtime series between 24 November and 5 December 2003. He was also seen in early 2004 in a Guinness television commercial, The Quarrel, playing a man who swims across the ocean from Ireland to apologise personally to his brother in New York; this commercial won a gold medal at the 2005 FAB Awards.

During the 2006 Edinburgh Festival Fringe, Fassbender played Michael Collins, his great-great-granduncle, in Allegiance, a play by Mary Kenny based on the meeting between Collins and Winston Churchill. In addition, Fassbender produced, directed, and starred in a stage version of Quentin Tarantino's Reservoir Dogs, along with his production company.

He appeared in Angel (UK title: The Real Life of Angel Deverell), about the rise and fall of an eccentric young British writer (played by Romola Garai) in the early 20th century. Fassbender plays her love interest, an average painter named Esmé. The drama—the first English-language effort by French director François Ozon and based on the novel by Elizabeth Taylor—premiered on 17 February 2007 at the Berlin International Film Festival and on 14 March 2007 in Paris. He then made a brief appearance in Dean Cavanagh and Irvine Welsh's Wedding Belles as Barney, speaking with a Scottish accent.

Mainstream success
In 2006, Fassbender played Stelios, a young Spartan warrior, in 300, a fantasy action film directed by Zack Snyder. The film was a commercial success. In preparation for his role as Provisional Irish Republican Army prisoner Bobby Sands in Steve McQueen's 2008 film Hunger, Fassbender adopted a diet that restricted him to 600 calories a day, weighing  as Sands. Regarded as his breakthrough, his performance earned him the British Independent Film Award. One year after his success at the Cannes Film Festival with Hunger, he appeared in two films. The first was Quentin Tarantino's Inglourious Basterds, in which he played the British officer Lieutenant Archie Hicox. The other film was Fish Tank directed by Andrea Arnold. Both films were critically acclaimed and Fassbender's work in them also well received.

In 2010, Fassbender appeared as Burke in Jonah Hex, a Western film. In an interview at San Diego Comic-Con International, a comic book convention, Fassbender commented of the role: "I kind of developed this character and really pushed it – I'll see how far I pushed it ... I had this idea about the character, he’s kind of psychotic, he gets his kicks in perverted ways. I didn’t want to make it very obvious or like something you've seen before." Hex received predominantly negative reviews. Responding to criticism of Jonah Hex in 2011, Fassbender commented: "Pretty awful, was it? I haven't seen it myself." He portrayed Quintus Dias in Neil Marshall's bloody Roman war-thriller-drama film Centurion, and was cast as Richard Wirth in the Joel Schumacher film Blood Creek alongside Dominic Purcell. The story centres on a West Virginia man who comes to terms with his moral qualms and helps his brother wipe out a family that had been protecting a Nazi occultist and who had kept his brother captive for him to feed off for years.
Fassbender portrayed Edward Rochester in the 2011 film Jane Eyre, featuring Mia Wasikowska in the title role, with Cary Fukunaga directing.

Fassbender portrayed Magneto in the superhero blockbuster X-Men: First Class, the prequel to X-Men. Set in 1962, it focuses on the friendship between Charles Xavier (played by James McAvoy) and Magneto and the origin of their groups, the X-Men and the Brotherhood of Mutants. The film was released on 3 June 2011 to general acclaim and financial success and promoted Fassbender to being more of a popular movie star. In 2011, Fassbender starred in A Dangerous Method by director David Cronenberg, playing Swiss psychiatrist and psychologist Carl Jung. The film premiered at the 2011 Venice Film Festival.

He also starred in Shame, as a man in his thirties struggling with his sexual addiction. Shame reunited him with director Steve McQueen and premiered at the 2011 Venice Film Festival, where Fassbender won a Volpi Cup Best Actor Award for his portrayal of Brandon. Fassbender was a serious contender for an Academy Award for Best Actor in a Leading Role, but he was not nominated, and according to various sources his full-frontal nudity and depiction of sexual encounters inspired voters "to fantasize, and not actually vote." Fassbender achieved critical acclaim for his portrayal in Shame and received nominations for a Golden Globe Award for Best Actor – Motion Picture Drama and a BAFTA Award for Best Actor in a Leading Role. Starring in the film raised Fassbender's profile leading to roles in larger films.

In 2012, he appeared as an MI6 agent in Haywire, an action-thriller directed by Steven Soderbergh, and in Ridley Scott's science fiction film Prometheus. Reviews praised both the film's visual aesthetic design and the acting, most notably Fassbender's performance as the android David 8. Fassbender played the title role in Ridley Scott's The Counselor, a 2013 film based on the Cormac McCarthy script. In 2013, he starred in 12 Years a Slave, his third collaboration with Steve McQueen. Fassbender's portrayal of Edwin Epps earned him an Academy Award nomination for Best Supporting Actor. Fassbender reprised the role of Magneto in X-Men: Days of Future Past (released 23 May 2014), the sequel to X-Men: First Class. Fassbender stars in the title role in Frank (released late summer 2014), a comedy loosely inspired by Frank Sidebottom, a comic persona created by English comedian Chris Sievey.

Fassbender co-starred in Slow West, a western starring Kodi Smit-McPhee and Ben Mendelsohn, in 2015. He played Silas, an enigmatic traveller. Fassbender played late Apple founder and CEO Steve Jobs in the Danny Boyle-directed film Steve Jobs, which began filming in January 2015, in San Francisco, U.S., and premiered in September of that year. The film is an adaptation of Walter Isaacson's book Steve Jobs. The screenplay was written by Aaron Sorkin. Fassbender became attached after Christian Bale dropped out of the project. His performance saw him nominated for the Academy Award for Best Actor.

Fassbender took on the Shakespearean role of Macbeth in a film directed by Justin Kurzel, where he teamed up with Academy Award winner Marion Cotillard as Lady Macbeth and David Thewlis as King Duncan. Filming for the production began in January 2014 and the film premiered at the 2015 Cannes Film Festival.

In 2016, Fassbender once again played Magneto in the film X-Men: Apocalypse. He next starred in The Light Between Oceans, based on the novel written by M. L. Stedman, and directed by Derek Cianfrance; the film began filming in New Zealand in late September 2014, and was released on 2 September 2016. Also in 2016, Fassbender starred in the thriller Trespass Against Us, with fellow Irishman Brendan Gleeson. His final film of the year was the adaptation of video game Assassin's Creed, which he co-produced through his DMC Film banner. It was released on 21 December 2016. Macbeth helmer Justin Kurzel directed, and co-star Marion Cotillard had a leading role, working with Fassbender again. In May 2017, Fassbender reprised his role as the android David, and played another character, in the sequel to Prometheus, Alien: Covenant. In 2015, Fassbender was cast as Harry Hole (becoming the first actor ever to portray the character) in The Snowman, an adaptation of Jo Nesbø's novel, directed by Tomas Alfredson and co-starring Rebecca Ferguson and Charlotte Gainsbourg. Filming began in January 2016 and the film was released in October 2017.

Fassbender reprised his role as Magneto in the 2019 film Dark Phoenix, which garnered unfavorable reviews and had a commercially unsuccessful theatrical run.

Future projects
Fassbender currently has two films in post-production. He will star alongside Arnold Schwarzenegger and David Hasselhoff in full-length sequel of 2015 short film Kung Fury 2. He will also star in Next Goal Wins, directed by Taika Waititi, based upon the documentary of the same name for Fox Searchlight Pictures.

Together with screenwriter Ronan Bennett, Fassbender has formed a production company, Finn McCool Films. Fassbender and Bennett are currently developing a film about the Irish mythological hero Cú Chulainn.

In March 2022, it was revealed that Fassbender was executive-producing a dystopian drama for Netflix, titled The Kitchen. The drama is being written by Daniel Kaluuya and Joe Murtagh.

Auto racing

Fassbender has expressed an interest in motorsport since his youth, stating in 2020, "Even before I started acting, I had a big dream to go racing." A fan of Formula One and Scuderia Ferrari, he was a member of the team's Corso Pilota training course in 2016.

He began racing in the Ferrari Challenge's Coppa Shell class in May 2017, finishing 15th in his debut at Mugello Circuit. He also raced in the Challenge's North American division, finishing sixth at Mazda Raceway Laguna Seca. In 2018, he ran the full Ferrari Challenge North America schedule, winning the season opener at Daytona International Speedway and finishing fifth in the standings.

Fassbender moved to Porsche in 2019, competing in the German Porsche Racing Experience and being the subject of a YouTube series by Porsche, called Road to Le Mans. The following year, he joined Proton Competition for the full 2020 European Le Mans Series, sharing a 2017 Porsche 911 RSR with Richard Lietz and Felipe Fernandez Laser. Later in the year Fassbender raced a guest car in the Porsche Supercup at Circuit de Catalunya and was involved in a startline crash putting him out of the race within seconds.

In 2021, Fassbender continued to race with Proton Competition in the European Le Mans Series. Fassbender and his co-drivers scored fourth-place finishes at the Red Bull Ring and at Spa-Francorchamps, before achieving his best-ever finish and his first podium at the last race at Portimão, finishing second behind the No. 80 Iron Lynx, eventual LMGTE champion. The team finished fourth in the LMGTE teams championship, with 61 points.

Complete European Le Mans Series results

(key) (Races in bold indicate pole position; results in italics indicate fastest lap)

Complete 24 Hours of Le Mans results

Personal life
Fassbender is known for preferring to keep his personal life private. He moved into an apartment in the Hackney area of London in 1996, and lived in the same apartment until he moved to Portugal in 2017.

Fassbender speaks German, though he stated that he needed to brush up on his spoken German before filming Inglourious Basterds because "it was a bit rusty". He has expressed interest in performing in a German-language film or play.

Fassbinder grew up as a Catholic altar-boy, but now has described himself as a lapsed Catholic, though he says that he still goes to church to light candles. He is a supporter of Liverpool FC.

In June 2012, Fassbender told GQ magazine that he was dating American actress Nicole Beharie, with whom he had worked on the 2011 film Shame. In December 2014, he began dating Swedish actress Alicia Vikander, with whom he had worked on the 2016 film The Light Between Oceans. They married in a private ceremony in Ibiza on 14 October 2017. They later moved to Portugal, where they reside in Lisbon. They have a son, born in 2021.

Works and accolades

References

External links

 
 Michael Fassbender on Box Office Mojo

1977 births
20th-century Irish male actors
21st-century Irish male actors
24 Hours of Le Mans drivers
Alumni of the Drama Centre London
Best Supporting Actor AACTA International Award winners
European Le Mans Series drivers
German emigrants to Ireland
Irish expatriate male actors in the United States
Irish expatriates in Portugal
Irish expatriates in the United Kingdom
Irish male film actors
Irish male stage actors
Irish male television actors
Irish racing drivers
Living people
Male actors from County Kerry
Male actors from Heidelberg
Male actors from London
Outstanding Performance by a Cast in a Motion Picture Screen Actors Guild Award winners
People educated at St Brendan's College, Killarney
People from Killarney
Sportspeople from County Kerry
Sportspeople from Heidelberg
Sportspeople from London
Volpi Cup for Best Actor winners
Porsche Motorsports drivers
Porsche Supercup drivers
Ferrari Challenge drivers